Folke Persson (23 January 1905 – 24 July 1964) was a Swedish painter. His work was part of the painting event in the art competition at the 1936 Summer Olympics.

References

1905 births
1964 deaths
20th-century Swedish painters
Swedish male painters
Olympic competitors in art competitions
People from Gothenburg
20th-century Swedish male artists